The Roman Catholic Diocese of Zhengzhou/Chengchow is a diocese located in the city of Zhengzhou in the Ecclesiastical province of Kaifeng in China.

History
 August 28, 1882: Established as the Apostolic Prefecture of Western Honan 河南西境 from the Apostolic Vicariate of Honan 河南
 May 2, 1911: Promoted as Apostolic Vicariate of Western Honan 河南西境
 December 3, 1924: Renamed as Apostolic Vicariate of Zhengzhou 鄭州
 April 11, 1946: Promoted as Diocese of Zhengzhou 鄭州

Leadership
 Bishops of Zhengzhou 鄭州 (Roman rite)
 Bishop Faustino M. Tissot, S.X. (May 10, 1946 – 1983)
 Vicars Apostolic of Zhengzhou 鄭州 (Roman Rite)
 Bishop Luigi Calza, S.X. (September 18, 1911 – October 22, 1944)
 Vicars Apostolic of Western Honan 河南西境 (Roman Rite)
 Bishop Luigi Calza, S.X. (June 23, 1906 – September 18, 1911)

References

 GCatholic.org
 Catholic Hierarchy

Roman Catholic dioceses in China
Religious organizations established in 1882
Roman Catholic dioceses and prelatures established in the 19th century
Christianity in Henan
1882 establishments in China
Religion in Zhengzhou